Fundición Tipográfica Nacional  or the  Nacional Typefoundry was for many years the leading type foundry of Spain.  It was founded in Madrid in 1915 and functioned there until bought out by Fundición Tipográfica Neufville of Barcelona in 1971.  It employed prestigious designers like Carlos Winkow and Enric Crous-Vidal and was noted for its bold and striking art deco faces.

Typefaces

References
Jaspert, W. Pincus, W. Turner Berry and A.F. Johnson. The Encyclopedia of Type Faces. Blandford Press Lts.: 1953, 1983. .

Letterpress font foundries of Spain
Design companies established in 1915
Manufacturing companies based in Madrid
Manufacturing companies established in 1915
Manufacturing companies disestablished in 1971
1971 disestablishments in Spain
Design companies disestablished in 1971
Spanish companies established in 1915